Laminosioptes is a genus of mites belonging to the family Laminosioptidae.

Species:

Laminosioptes cisticola 
Laminosioptes collaris 
Laminosioptes myiopsittae 
Laminosioptes reticulata

References

Sarcoptiformes
Acari genera